Cephalocroton is a genus of plant of the family Euphorbiaceae first described as a genus in 1841. It is native to central, eastern, and southern Africa from Nigeria and Ethiopia south to KwaZulu-Natal.

Use
The dead wood of some species can be used as a fumigant.

Species
 Cephalocroton cordofanus Hochst. - Nigeria, Sudan, South Sudan, Ethiopia, Somalia, Kenya, Tanzania
 Cephalocroton incanus M.G.Gilbert - Nigeria, Ethiopia
 Cephalocroton mollis Klotzsch - Tanzania, Mozambuque, Zimbabwe, Malawi, Botswana, Namibia, KwaZulu-Natal, Limpopo, Mpumalanga
 Cephalocroton polygynus Pax & K.Hoffm. - Somalia
formerly included
moved to other genera (Adenochlaena Cephalocrotonopsis Cladogynos Epiprinus Sumbaviopsis )

References

Epiprineae
Flora of Africa
Euphorbiaceae genera